Slater's Ales is a brewery located Stafford, the county town of Staffordshire, in England.  The brewery dates back to 1995 when the company was formed by Ged Slater, originally being based in Eccleshall.

References

External links

Breweries in England
Companies based in the West Midlands (county)